Senate elections were held for the first time in Thailand on 4 March 2000. All candidates ran as independents, as they were forbidden from running on a party ticket.

Results

References

Thailand
Senate election
Elections in Thailand
Non-partisan elections